The black-browed babbler (Malacocincla perspicillata) is a songbird species in the family Pellorneidae. The species is endemic to Borneo. Only a single specimen collected in the nineteenth century was known, until the species was rediscovered in Borneo in 2020.

Habitat

Its rediscovery in 2020 confirmed that the bird is from southeast Borneo.

Conservation status
The conservation status of M. perspicillata is insufficiently known. It was formerly classified as Vulnerable by the IUCN, but due to the lack of information surrounding the species, its status was changed to Data Deficient in 2008. The songbird is threatened by agriculture, logging allowed within protected areas, plantations for rubber and palm oil, and drought fires. Within the next few years, there is risk of near complete loss of dryland lowland forest in Kalimantan.

Rediscovery
In October 2020, M. perspicillata was rediscovered in South Kalimantan by two local men, Muhammad Suranto and Muhammad Rizky Fauzan, 170 years after the last confirmed sighting.
 
Interest in the rediscovery has drawn birdwatchers to the area and added to knowledge of the bird's behaviour, such as: "moving in and out of the limestone caves and crevices, clambering about in the rugged environment to hunt insects and other invertebrates", and its song: "a unique, loud and melodious vocalisation, often sounded in a duet."

References

Sources
 BirdLife International (BLI) (2008): 2008 IUCN Redlist status changes. Retrieved 23 May 2008
 Collar, N.J.; Robson, C. (2007): Family Timaliidae (Babblers). In: del Hoyo, Josep; Elliott, Andrew; Christie, D.A. (eds.): Handbook of Birds of the World, Volume 12 (Picathartes to Tits and Chickadees): 70–291. Barcelona: Lynx Edicions.

External links
Black-browed Babbler: (Malacocincla perspicillata) BirdLife Species Factsheet
Photograph of a living specimen included in a March 2, 2021 New York Times news summary
A news article by the BBC about the bird's rediscovery in 2020

Further reading
Bonaparte CL (1850). Conspectus Generum Avium. Tom. I. [Volume I]. Leiden: E.J. Brill. 543 pp. (Cacopitta (Myothera) perspicillata, new species, p. 257). (in Latin).

Malacocincla
Endemic birds of Borneo
Birds described in 1850
Taxa named by Charles Lucien Bonaparte
Articles containing video clips
Taxonomy articles created by Polbot
Borneo lowland rain forests